Live at the Caledonien Hall is a live album by Norwegian avant-garde metal band In the Woods..., released in 2003.

Track listing 
CD one
 "Introducing" - 2:21
 "Medley on Heartworks" - 8:46
 "Heart of the Ages" - 6:04
 "Beer" - 4:45
 "White Rabbit" - 3:27 (Jefferson Airplane cover)
 "Mouring the Death of Aases" - 5:23
 "299.796 km/s" - 10:32
 "I Am Your Flesh" - 6:41
 "Kairos!" - 03:18
 "Weeping Willow" - 10:13
 "Omnio (Pre)" - 10:21

CD two
 "Omnio (Bardo + Post)" - 14:21
 "Empty Room" - 10:24
 "Don't Care" - 9:02
 "Dead Man's Creek" - 7:22
 "Karmakosmik" - 6:39
 "Path of the Righteous" - 6:06
 "Titan Transcendence" - 5:04
 "Epitaph" - 8:53 (King Crimson cover)
 "Closing In" - 5:51

Personnel 
 Mista Transit / vocals
 Synne / female vocals
 C:M Botteri / bass
 X-Botteri / guitar
 A. Kobro / drums
 Christer A. Cederberg / guitar (& vocals on "Don't Care")
 Oddvar A:M / guitar
 Björn / guitar
 Stein / bass

In the Woods... albums
2003 live albums
The End Records live albums